The 2022 HFX Wanderers FC season was the fourth season in the history of HFX Wanderers FC. In addition to the Canadian Premier League, the club competed in the Canadian Championship.

Current squad

Transfers

In

Draft picks 
HFX Wanderers will make the following selections in the 2022 CPL–U Sports Draft. Draft picks are not automatically signed to the team roster. Only those who are signed to a contract will be listed as transfers in.

Out

Loans out

Pre-season and friendlies
On March 11, HFX Wanderers FC announced that the club had played New Brunswick club CS Dieppe in a friendly earlier that day. On March 16, the club announced that it would hold a pre-season camp in Mississauga, Ontario with friendlies against Forge FC and clubs in League1 Ontario.

Competitions
Matches are listed in Halifax local time: Atlantic Daylight Time (UTC−3) until November 5, and Atlantic Standard Time (UTC−4) otherwise.

Overview

Canadian Premier League

Table

Results by match

Matches

Canadian Championship

Statistics

Squad and statistics 

|-
 

 

 
 
 

 

|}

Top scorers

Clean sheets

Disciplinary record

References

External links 
Official Site

2022
2022 Canadian Premier League
Canadian soccer clubs 2022 season
2022 in Nova Scotia